Tony Holguin (October 18, 1926 – May 14, 2009) was an American professional golfer who played on the PGA Tour and the Senior PGA Tour.

Holguin learned the game of golf while growing up in San Antonio, Texas during the Great Depression. His family, which was of Mexican descent, had no money and could not afford an automobile. He spent much time at home, practicing his putting.

Holguin served in the U.S. Army during World War II. He won the San Antonio City Championship in 1946 and 1947. He turned professional in 1948.

Holguin won the Mexican Open in 1949 and 1950. His best finish in a major championship was T17 at PGA Championship in 1957. The biggest win of his career came in 1953 at the Texas Open. In 1957, Holguin tied Arnold Palmer for third place in the Texas Open. His majors resume consists of three Masters, six U.S. Opens and eight PGA Championships.

At the opening round of the Bing Crosby National Pro-Am in January 1954, Holguin set the course record of 63 at the Monterey Peninsula Country Club, now known as its Dunes Course.

Like most professional golfers of his generation, Holguin earned a living primarily as a club professional. He became club pro at Midlothian (Illinois) Country Club in 1952. He also worked at Gleneagles Country Club in Lemont, Illinois and Balmoral Woods Country Club in Crete, Illinois. In 2007, he was inducted into the Illinois Section PGA Hall of Fame.

Holguin was the spokesman for Fairwinds, a failed development that included a Holiday Inn and future golf course. He also was to be the teaching professional at Fairwinds. A golf course was built after the development failed, which became Balmoral Woods CC.

Amateur wins
1946 San Antonio City Championship
1947 San Antonio City Championship

Professional wins

PGA Tour wins (1)
1953 Texas Open

Other wins
this list may be incomplete
1949 Mexican Open
1950 Mexican Open
1954 Illinois PGA Championship
1962 Illinois PGA Championship
1970 Illinois PGA Championship

References

American male golfers
PGA Tour golfers
PGA Tour Champions golfers
Golfers from San Antonio
Golfers from Illinois
American sportspeople of Mexican descent
People from Oak Forest, Illinois
1926 births
2009 deaths